Campo de Cartagena, is a natural region (comarca) located in the Region of Murcia, in Spain. For administrative purposes, it is also known, as Comarca del Campo de Cartagena or Comarca de Cartagena. It is located in the southeast of the Iberian Peninsula, forming a plain which extends from the Sierra de Carrascoy to the Mediterranean. The capital city is Cartagena, the most important Naval Base of the Spanish Navy in the Mediterranean Sea.

The comarca contains 393,598 inhabitants (2019) in an area of 1,481.8 km², making up the metropolitan area of Cartagena, a center for tourism, culture, industry and nature, with more than 18,500 protected hectares, among places like the Calblanque, Monte de las Cenizas y Peña del Águila Natural Park; the Sierra de la Muela, Cabo Tiñoso and Roldán Natural Park; Salinas y Arenales de San Pedro del Pinatar or Islas e Islotes del Litoral Mediterráneo (Islands and Islets of the Mediterranean Shore), among others. Beside those places, it must be added much of the marine environment, highlighting the Mar Menor, the Marine Reserve of Cabo de Palos e Islas Hormigas, and the Cape Tiñoso surroundings.

Municipalities
The comarca is composed of eight municipalities, listed below with their areas and populations:

History 

The Campo de Cartagena has valuable remains of its ancient past. In the city of Cartagena can be seen numerous monuments, museums and archaeological remains.

An attempt was made during the First Spanish Republic, on July 12 of 1873 to establish a canton in the Cartagena area. The insurgency took the name Cantonal Revolution and in the following days it spread through many other regions. Following the revolt the city of Cartagena endured for several months the attack of the troops sent by Nicolás Salmerón to restore order.

See also
Comarcas of Spain
Sierra minera de Cartagena-La Unión
Mar Menor
El Carmolí

References

External links

 Ayuntamiento de Cartagena
 Ayuntamiento de Fuente Álamo
 Aprovechamientos Forestales en la Comarca del Campo de Cartagena durante la Edad Media
Los Tribunales Sacrales en el Campo de Cartagena

Comarcas of the Region of Murcia
Historical regions in Spain
Eutrophication